Almost Married is a lost 1919 silent film comedy drama directed by Charles Swickard and starring May Allison. It was produced and distributed by Metro Pictures.

Cast
May Allison as Adrienne Le Blanc
June Elvidge as Patricia 'Patty' Hudson
Sam Hardy as Lt. James Winthrop, Jr.
Walter Percival as Carrington O'Connell (credited as Walter I. Percival)
Frank Currier as Michael O'Connell
Malcolm Fassatt as Walter Kirkwood
William T. Carleton as James Winthrop, Sr. (credited as W.T. Carleton)
Harry L. Rattenberry as Papa Le Blanc
Wharton James as Hastings (credited as James Wharton James)
Hugh Fay as Manny Morrison

References

External links

1919 films
Lost American films
American silent feature films
Metro Pictures films
1919 comedy-drama films
1919 lost films
Lost comedy-drama films
1910s American films
Silent American comedy-drama films
1910s English-language films
English-language comedy-drama films